Kupwara massacre refers to an incident that took place in Kupwara district of Union Territory of Jammu and Kashmir on 27 January 1994. The incident took place at 11 am on that day. The Indian army was accused of killing 27 persons and injuring 38 persons which mainly include civilians and some policeman by opening fire randomly in all directions.

See also
Bijbehara massacre
Gawakadal massacre
Handwara massacre
Human rights abuses in Jammu and Kashmir
Sopore massacre
1994 Kupwara Massacre: 27 civilians shot dead for 'observing shutdown on Jan 26'
https://www.kupwaratimes.org/1994-kupwara-massacre-27-civilians-shot-dead-for-observing-shutdown-on-jan-26/

References 

 Kupwara massacre 1994". Archived from the original on 30 January 2015. Retrieved 29 January 2015.
 .
 Risingkashmir.com/kupwara-massacre-1994". Retrieved 29 January 2015.
 Kupwara Massacre". Retrieved 27 January 2021.

Kupwara district
Massacres in Jammu and Kashmir
Massacres committed by India